Mildred Gover (1905–1947) was an American film actress.

Selected filmography
 Alimony Madness (1933)
 Mrs. Wiggs of the Cabbage Patch (1934)
 High School Girl (1934)
 Ring Around the Moon (1936)
 Penrod and Sam (1937)
 My Old Kentucky Home (1938)
 The Affairs of Annabel (1938)
 Brother Rat (1938)
 Day-Time Wife (1939)
 Ladies Must Live (1940)
 Rise and Shine (1941)

References

Bibliography
 Pitts, Michael R. Western Movies: A Guide to 5,105 Feature Films. McFarland, 2012.

External links

1905 births
1947 deaths
American film actresses
20th-century American actresses